Bulinus senegalensis is a species of gastropods belonging to the family Bulinidae.

The species is found in Africa.

References

senegalensis
Gastropods described in 1781
Gastropods of Africa